
Gmina Turawa, German Gemeinde Turawa is a rural gmina (administrative district) in Opole County, Opole Voivodeship, in south-western Poland.

Villages
The commune contains the villages and settlements of:

Turawa
Bierdzany
Borek
Kadłub Turawski
Kotórz Mały
Kotórz Wielki
Ligota Turawska
Marszałki
Osowiec Śląski
Rzędzów
Trzęsina
Węgry
Zakrzów Turawski
Zawada

Demographics
As of 31 December 2010, the commune had 9,595 inhabitants. At the time of the census of 2002, the commune had 9,609 inhabitants. Of these, 5,673 (59%) declared the Polish nationality; 2,028 persons (21.1%) declared the German nationality; and 671 (7%) with the non-recognized Silesian nationality. 1,223 inhabitants (12.7%) declared no nationality.

Neighbouring gminas
Gmina Turawa is bordered by the city of Opole and by the gminas of Chrząstowice, Lasowice Wielkie, Łubniany, Ozimek and Zębowice.

Notable people
Joachim Prinz (1902–1988), Rabbi

Twin towns – sister cities

Gmina Turawa is twinned with:
 Dřevohostice, Czech Republic
 Saalfelder Höhe (Saalfeld), Germany
 Wetter, Germany

References

Turawa
Opole County
Bilingual communes in Poland